KYKNOS S.A. (Greek: Κύκνος meaning swan) is the oldest Greek canning company, founded in 1915 in Nafplion. 

It manufactures tomato paste, purée, ketchup and tomato sauces. it is one of the major tomato paste brands in the country and a supplier of tomato paste for many brands throughout the world.

In 2002 the company’s production and distribution centers were relocated to the village of Savalia, Elis.

History
The company was founded by Michail Manoussakis while he was still physics teacher at the Piraeus High School.  Michail and his brother Kostis Manoussakis manufactured the first 1000 cans of whole peeled tomatoes on the Kostis Farm in Assini, which is in the Argolis region.

Logo
Its logo includes a swan over the sea. Its colour is red.

See also
List of companies in Greece

External links
 Kyknos Home Page Greek & English
 Kyknos Home Page German

Food and drink companies of Greece
Greek brands